Natalia Anna Kicka (1801–4 April 1888) was a Polish archaeologist, numismatist and social activist.

Biography
Natalia Anna Kicka was born as the eldest of four daughters to Piotr Bisping, marshal of Wołkowysk and Józefa Kicka and grew up on a family estate in Hołowczyce.

Kicka collected coins and medals and worked with several pioneers of the numismatic movement in Poland, especially Karol Beyer, Emeryk Huten-Czapski and Kazimierz Strończyński. In the 1870s she conducted archaeological excavations in Kujawy on the so-called Kuyavian Pyramids.

She married Ludwik Kicki, in January 1831. He died in the same year at the Battle of Ostrołęka (1831). Her memoirs are a valuable historical source for the November Uprising. Kicka is buried at the Powązki Cemetery in Warsaw.

Memoirs
Pamiętniki; wstęp i przypisy Józef Dutkiewicz; tekst opracowal, przypisy uzupełnił oraz indeksy sporządził Tadeusz Szafrański. Warsaw: Instytut Wydawniczy “Pax”, 1972

References

1801 births
1888 deaths
Women classical scholars
Polish women archaeologists
19th-century Polish archaeologists
Scientists from Vilnius
19th-century diarists
19th-century memoirists